These products, even though Netflix lists them as Netflix Originals, are programs that have been aired in different countries, and Netflix has bought exclusive distribution rights to stream them in other various countries. They may be available on Netflix in their home territory and other markets where Netflix does not have the first run license, without the Netflix Original label, some time after their first-run airing on their original broadcaster.

Drama

Comedy

Animation

Adult animation

Anime

Kids & family

Non-English language scripted

Arabic

Catalan

Danish

Dutch

Finnish

French

German

Hebrew

Italian

Japanese

Korean

Mandarin

Norwegian

Polish

Portuguese

Russian

Spanish

Swedish

Thai

Turkish

Other

Unscripted

Docuseries

Reality

Variety

Specials

Notes

References

External links

Netflix
Netflix
Lists of Netflix original programming